The 1960–61 Ohio State Buckeyes men's basketball team represented Ohio State University. The team's head coach was Fred Taylor.

Roster

NCAA basketball tournament
Mideast
Ohio State 56, Louisville 55
Ohio State 87, Kentucky 74
Final Four
Ohio State 95, St. Joseph’s, Pennsylvania 69
Cincinnati 70, Ohio State 65 OT

Rankings

Awards and honors
 John Havlicek, First-Team All Big Ten
 Jerry Lucas, All-America selection
 Jerry Lucas, NCAA Men's MOP Award
 Jerry Lucas, Chicago Tribune Silver Basketball
 Jerry Lucas, First-Team All Big Ten
 Jerry Lucas, USBWA College Player of the Year
 Larry Siegfried, First-Team All Big Ten

Team players drafted into the NBA

References

Ohio State Buckeyes men's basketball seasons
NCAA Division I men's basketball tournament Final Four seasons
Ohio State Buckeyes
Ohio State
Ohio State Buckeyes
Ohio State Buckeyes